The Anti-Mui Tsai Society was an organisation founded in 26 March 1922 dedicated to abolishing the Mui-tsai system (akin to child slavery) in colonial Hong Kong.

Background

Influence 

The Anti-Mui Tsai Society marked the increasing social activism of Chinese Christians and labour unions in colonial Hong Kong.

Its opponents included the Society for the Protection of the Mui Tsai, which was backed by prominent merchants in the Chinese community, including Lau Chu Pak, Ho Fook and Ho Kum Tong.

In popular culture 
 Silver Spoon, Sterling Shackles, a 2012 Hong Kong television drama produced by Television Broadcasts Limited (TVB)

See also 
 Mui Tsai
 Anti-Mui Tsai Activism
 Society for the Protection of the Mui Tsai

References

Further reading 
  https://books.google.com/books?id=VcndjbdTUBYC
 
 
 Episode 8 – Anti-Mui Tsai Movement 2010-01-06 http://programme.rthk.org.hk/rthk/tv/programme.php?p=4639&d=2010-01-06&e=102369&m=episode

History of Hong Kong
Organisations based in Hong Kong
Organizations established in 1922
Abolitionism in Asia
1922 establishments in Asia
1922 in Hong Kong
Abolitionist organizations